Palazzo Salviati may refer to:

 Palazzo Salviati (Dorsoduro), a palace in Venice
 Palazzo Salviati (Rome), a palace in Rome
 Palazzo Salviati-Borghese, a palace in Florence